Lieutenant Joseph Frankel (1882-1956) was an American klezmer musician, clarinetist and military band bandleader of the early 20th century.

Biography

Early life
Frankel was born in Kyiv, Kiev Governorate, Russian Empire on October 19, 1882. He began learning music at age five. He entered the Kiev Conservatory in 1896, graduating with honours in 1899. After graduating, he became bandleader for the 150th infantry unit of the Imperial Russian army.

Music career
In 1904, Frankel toured the United States as the head of the Russian 14th regiment military band. He decided to settle in the New York area, and married his wife Ida in 1905.

At the outbreak of the First World War he was on tour in South America with a Russian orchestra. He decided to become an American citizen and enlisted in the U.S. Army, becoming bandmaster of the 1st Field Artillery Regiment in New York City.

His main recorded output took place during the period immediately after the First World War. During the period of 1919 to 1921 he recorded a series of klezmer music recordings for Columbia Records. Some of these recordings incorporated elements of popular American music, with titles such as Yiddelach Shimmy Tantz (1919) or Yiddishe Blues (1919).

In the 1920s Frankel relocated to Philadelphia, where he directed a number of orchestras, not only the band of the 108th Field Artillery Regiment, the Municipal Band of Philadelphia, and the Hahnemann College orchestra. He apparently resigned his military commission in 1926.
In 1928 Frankel volunteered his time as a bandleader to train a 25-person band at the National Farm School. In the 1930s, with funding from the Works Progress Administration, Frankel put together a 90-person orchestra.

Frankel died while visiting Boston on July 12, 1956. He was buried in the Montefiore Cemetery in Jenkintown, Pennsylvania.

References

External links
Joseph Frankel handwritten music scores in the Library of Congress collection
Lt. Joseph Frankel Orchestra recordings in the Florida Atlantic University Judaica collection
Lt. Joseph Frankel's Orchestra recordings list at the Discography of American Historical Recordings

1882 births
1956 deaths
Emigrants from the Russian Empire to the United States
Musicians from Kyiv
Klezmer musicians
Jewish American musicians
United States military musicians
Columbia Records artists
Musicians from Philadelphia
American clarinetists